Amarna Letter EA5, one of the Amarna letters (cited with the abbreviation EA, for "El Amarna"), is a correspondence between Kadašman-Enlil I and Amenhotep III.

The letter exists as two artifacts, one at the British Museum (BM29787) and one in the Cairo Museum (C12195).

The letter is part of a series of correspondences from Babylonia to Egypt, which run from EA2 to EA4 and EA6 to EA14. EA1 and EA5 are from Egypt to Babylonia.

The letter

EA 5: Gifts of Egyptian Furniture for the Babylonian Palace
EA 5, letter five of five, Pharaoh to Kadashman-Enlil. (Not a linear, line-by-line translation.)

Obverse: (see here )

Paragraph 1

Paragraph 2

See also
Chronology of the ancient Near East
Amarna letters: EA 1, EA 2, EA 3, EA 4, EA 6, EA 7, EA 8, EA 9, EA 10, EA 11
List of Amarna letters by size
EA 5, EA 9, EA 15, EA 19, EA 26, EA 27, EA 35, EA 38 
EA 153, EA 161, EA 288, EA 364, EA 365, EA 367

References

External links

Photo EA 5, Obverse, (British Museum piece: BM 29787)
Photo EA 5, Reverse, (British Museum piece: BM 29787) (note: line 17 from Obverse extends across the entire Reverse (upside down cuneiform))
British Museum page for Amarna letter EA 5
CDLI entry of EA 5 ( Chicago Digital Library Initiative )
CDLI listing of all EA Amarna letters, 1-382

Amarna letters